A Madea Christmas may refer to:

A Madea Christmas (musical play)
A Madea Christmas (film)